Alex Renato Ibarra Mina (born 20 January 1991) is an Ecuadorian professional footballer who plays for Ecuadorian club LDU Quito, on loan from América, and the Ecuador national team.

Club career

El Nacional
He had been playing throughout his youth at the Ecuadorian team El Nacional.
Ibarra's debut came in on 17 May 2009 in a 3–0 win over CD Olmedo. His first career goal and first goal for El Nacional came on 9 March 2011, a 30-meter long shot that was to be vital goal in a 1–0 win over Independiente Jose Teran. He would go on to score 2 more goals for El "Nacho", against Deportivo Cuenca and Imbabura. A great showing in the Ecuadorian Serie A and at the 2011 FIFA U-20 World Cup have gained him interest from several European clubs, such as Chelsea and Vitesse Arnhem, the latter signing him in the summer of 2011. He would finish his career for El Nacional having played 31 games and scoring 3 goals.

Vitesse
On 8 July 2011 Vitesse acquired Renato Ibarra's services for a contract of three years at the club. His debut came on 27 November 2011 in a 0–0 draw versus FC Twente. He scored his debut goal for Vitesse on 16 March 2012, in a 2–0 win against SC Heracles. His second goal came on 15 April 2012, in a 1–0 victory over ADO Den Haag. His third and final goal of the season came against RKC Waalwijk on 20 May. He would finish his debut season with 3 goals in 23 league games played, and became part of the squad's starting line-up.

Renato's season debut was on 18 August 2012 in a 1–0 win over FC Zwolle, where he scored the only goal. On 3 November, Renato curved a beautiful cross for Wilfried Bony's second goal in a 2–0 away win against AFC Ajax, ending their unbeaten run in all competitions. In just several games he's become an influential winger for Vitesse, assisting Wilfried Bony with great accurate crosses. On 19 December, Renato scored a double in Vitesse's historic 10–1 cup-match win over ADO '20. On 27 January 2013, Renato scored the winning goal in a vital and thrilling 3–2 home win against Dutch giants AFC Ajax. On 6 April, Renato scored his 3rd goal of the season, in a 3–0 home win over NAC Breda, dribbling past 3 defenders to score the 2nd goal of the match. Renato finished the season having scored a total of 5 goals in all competitions for Vitesse.

Renato scored his first goal of the season on 4 August, in his season debut match, winning 3–1 against Heracles at home stadium.

América
On 10 June 2016, Ibarra joined Mexican side Club América in a reported US$2 million deal, signing a three-year contract. Ibarra went on to win the Apertura 2018 and reaching the Apertura 2016 and 2019 finals. On 12 March 2020, América issued a statement announcing Ibarra would no longer be part of the squad due to his charges of domestic violence.

Atlas
On 3 July 2020, Ibarra joined Liga MX side Atlas F.C. on a loan agreement for one year with the option for a permanent deal.

Return to América

For the Apertura 2021 season, América included Ibarra in their roster after since he had a contract with the club and Solari deemed him necessary to strengthen his squad. Nonetheless, Renato was only able to play one game for America in which he scored a goal but ended the game with an injury that will require surgery, for which he will miss the rest of the season.

International career

Ibarra was part of the Ecuadorian squad which played at the 2011 South American U-20 Championship, qualifying 4th for the 2011 FIFA U-20 World Cup. The squad went on to reach the round-of-16, being defeated by France.

On 20 April 2011, Ibarra made his debut for the senior national team in a friendly match against Argentina. 

He also participated with the national team at the 2014 FIFA World Cup and 2015 Copa América tournaments. Ibarra was included in the provisional squad for the 2016 Copa América Centenario, but was left out of the final 23-man squad.

Career statistics

International goals
Scores and results list Ecuador's goal tally first.

Honours
América
Liga MX: Apertura 2018
Copa MX: Clausura 2019
Campeón de Campeones: 2019

References

External links

 Voetbal International profile 

1991 births
Living people
People from Ibarra Canton
Association football wingers
Ecuadorian footballers
Ecuador under-20 international footballers
C.D. El Nacional footballers
SBV Vitesse players
Club América footballers
Atlas F.C. footballers
L.D.U. Quito footballers
Eredivisie players
Liga MX players
Ecuadorian Serie A players
Ecuadorian expatriate footballers
Expatriate footballers in Mexico
Expatriate footballers in the Netherlands
Ecuador international footballers
2014 FIFA World Cup players
2015 Copa América players
2019 Copa América players